Melissa Elizabeth Lucio (born June 18, 1969) is the first woman of Hispanic descent to be sentenced to death in the U.S. state of Texas. She was convicted of capital murder after the death of her two-year-old daughter, Mariah, who was found to have scattered bruising in various stages of healing, as well as injuries to her head and contusions of the kidneys, lungs and spinal cord. Prosecutors said that Mariah's injuries were the result of physical abuse, while Lucio's attorneys say that her death was caused by a fall down the stairs two days prior.

Lucio's case was the subject of a 2020 documentary, The State of Texas vs. Melissa. She has maintained her innocence, and Cornell Law School professor Sandra Babcock has called the prosecution "by far the weakest capital case I've ever seen". Lucio's execution was set for April 27, 2022, but an appeals court granted her a stay on April 25, 2022.

Early life
Melissa Lucio was born in Lubbock, Texas, on June 18, 1969, according to court records. Her father died when she was an infant, and the family moved to the Rio Grande Valley, where her mother had grown up, when she was a toddler. Lucio says she was sexually abused by her mother's boyfriend for about two years, beginning when she was seven years old. Lucio was married at the age of 16 and had her first five children with Guadalupe Lucio. She stated that he was often addicted to drugs and alcohol and was physically abusive. Lucio then had seven children with Robert Alvarez. Two more children (twins) were born while she was imprisoned.

Death of Mariah Alvarez
Mariah Alvarez was born to Melissa Lucio and Robert Alvarez in September 2004. Mariah was Lucio's twelfth child. Child Protective Services had previously investigated Lucio for allegations of child neglect, and they reported that Lucio's youngest children were often left in the care of their teenaged siblings. Lucio was addicted to cocaine and tested positive shortly after Mariah was born; this prompted authorities to place her children in foster care. Three older children went to live in Houston with their father, and Lucio regained custody of the others in late 2006. 

On February 17, 2007, paramedics were called to the Lucio residence because two-year-old Mariah was unresponsive and not breathing. According to the Cameron County District Attorney's Office, Mariah was found at the home with signs of abuse on her body. She had scattered bruising, bite marks on her back, patches of hair that had been pulled out, and a broken arm. According to Lucio, Mariah had sustained the injuries when she fell down a flight of stairs two days earlier. It was later determined that Mariah's arm had been broken two to seven weeks before her death, and an autopsy also showed a head injury and bruising of the kidneys, lungs and spinal cord. The child was pronounced dead at a local hospital.

Interrogations 
Following Mariah's death, Lucio was arrested and questioned for seven hours by Texas Ranger Victor Escalon without a lawyer present, and without receiving food or water. She admitted to having spanked Mariah, but denied ever having abused her, which she repeated more than 100 times. She was then told by Escalon: "Right now, it looks like you're a cold-blooded killer. Now, are you a cold-blooded killer or were you a frustrated mother who just took it out on [Mariah]?" He continued by telling her, "We already know what happened". After several hours of interrogation, Lucio stated, "I guess I did it. I'm responsible."

One of Lucio's sons was also questioned by law enforcement shortly after Mariah's death. In a video, a female officer asks the boy: "Did you see your sister fall down the stairs or did somebody tell you that she fell?" The boy then responded: "No, I saw her fall."

Legal proceedings 
During the trial, Lucio's recorded statements from her interrogation were described as a confession by Cameron County District Attorney Armando Villalobos, who was seeking re-election at the time. A pathologist, Dr. Norma J. Farley, testified that the child’s autopsy indicated that she did not die from falling down stairs, and instead her injuries were consistent with a death from blunt force trauma. Additionally, court documents state that the emergency room physician said he had not seen a case of child abuse worse than Mariah's.

Lucio’s defense argued that Mariah's injuries were from falling down the stairs, and that Lucio's psychological functioning contributed to her conflicting reports given to authorities. Despite the defense's arguments, Lucio was found guilty of capital murder and later sentenced to death in 2008.

Post-conviction 
Lucio was pregnant with twins at the time of Mariah's death, and authorities compelled her to place them for adoption after delivering them while in jail. As of 2022, Lucio is being held on death row at the Mountain View Unit in Gatesville, Texas.

A 2011 appeal against the conviction was denied by the Texas Court of Criminal Appeals. In 2019, a three-judge panel of the Federal Appeals Court overturned the sentence and ordered a retrial because of the trial court's interference in Lucio's right to present a defense. This decision was subsequently overturned in an en banc hearing of the same court and Lucio remained on death row.

Forensic pathologist Dr. Thomas Young, the former chief medical examiner in Kansas City, Missouri, reviewed the case at the request of Lucio's post-conviction attorney. He concluded that Dr. Farley appeared to have jumped to wrong conclusions. In the similar case of Manuel Velez, a man who was initially convicted for murdering a one-year-old baby and whose death sentence was overturned after further investigation, Farley's conclusions had also been contradicted by other medical experts.

In August 2021, an amicus brief was filed on Lucio's behalf by a group consisting of legal scholars, experts on violence against women, and representatives from sixteen organizations that combat violence against women. The brief states that Lucio's subdued behavior and acquiescence during interrogation were the result of prior trauma as a survivor of abuse. They also argued that a judge's order to exclude expert testimony on the effects of trauma had "deprived Melissa of the only means she had of explaining that, notwithstanding her demeanor and self-incriminating statements, she was innocent of her daughter's murder."  

In January 2022, Cameron County officials signed an execution warrant for Lucio. She was scheduled for execution on April 27, 2022. Lucio subsequently petitioned for clemency. If a majority of the Board of Pardons and Paroles were to recommend it, Governor Greg Abbott could grant clemency. The parole board was scheduled to vote on Lucio's clemency petition two days before the execution. In a March 2022 letter to the Board of Pardons and Paroles and to Governor Abbott, eighty-three members of the Texas House of Representatives, including both Democrats and Republicans, signed a letter stating that executing Lucio would be "a miscarriage of justice". 

In April 2022, a juror on the trial, Johnny Galvan Jr., wrote in the Houston Chronicle that he had wrongly succumbed to peer pressure during deliberations and had changed his vote from a life sentence to the death penalty. The Mexican Ambassador to the United States, Esteban Moctezuma, announced on April 22 that he sent a letter to Governor Abbott asking him to grant executive clemency to Lucio, as "Mexico has historically manifested an unwavering commitment in its opposition to the death penalty."

On April 25, 2022, the Texas Court of Criminal Appeals issued a stay of execution and ordered the 138th Judicial District Court of Cameron County to consider new evidence of Lucio's innocence in the death of her daughter.

In popular culture
A 2020 documentary by Sabrina Van Tassel titled The State of Texas vs. Melissa follows Lucio's case. It played at the Tribeca Film Festival in 2020, and won best documentary at the Raindance Film Festival.

On March 6, 2022, in the main segment of an episode of the HBO show Last Week Tonight with John Oliver called "Wrongful Convictions", her case was the main one to be mentioned as a reason for the reform of the American justice system and specifically, the abolition of the Antiterrorism and Effective Death Penalty Act of 1996 (AEDPA). On April 17, 2022, in the main segment of another episode, called "Police Interrogations", Lucio's case was mentioned again as having every hallmark of a false confession.

See also
 List of death row inmates in the United States
 List of people scheduled to be executed in the United States
 List of women on death row in the United States

References

1968 births
American people convicted of murder
American prisoners sentenced to death
Criminals from Texas
Living people
People convicted of murder by Texas
Prisoners sentenced to death by Texas
People from Lubbock, Texas
Women sentenced to death
Hispanic and Latino American women